The ralé-poussé is a diatonic accordion played on the island of Réunion in the southwest Indian Ocean. It is played in the Creole music of the 20th century.

The name refers to the "push-pull" motion of diatonic playing, which distinguishes the instrument's playing style as it rhythmically swaps between the "push" set of notes and "pull" set of notes.

References

See also
Music of Réunion

Free reed aerophones
Réunionnais musical instruments